Alexa Gruschow is an American-born women's ice hockey player that won the scoring title during the 2017-18 NWHL season. She was also a member of the Metropolitan Riveters franchise that won the 2018 Isobel Cup.

Playing career

NCAA
With the Rensselaer Engineers, Gruschow appeared in 133 games with the program, accumulating 46 goals and 47 assists for a total of 93 points. Graduating third on the Engineer's all-time scoring list, trailing Alisa Harrison and Whitney Naslund, she also ranks second all-time in goals scored, trailing only Naslund.

During her senior season, she registered a career-best 23 points in 34 appearances, logging 13 goals plus 10 assists. In addition, she paced the Engineers in power play goals with four, while also leading with 115 shots, 313 face-off wins and a .503 face-off winning percentage, respectively.

Signing a player contract with the New York Riveters on June 21, 2016, Gruschow became the second Engineers alumnae to compete in the NWHL, following Jordan Smelker, who captured an Isobel Cup title with the Boston Pride in 2015.

Career stats

NCAA

NWHL

Awards and honors

NCAA
2013 ECAC All-Rookie Team
2013 ECAC All-Academic
2013 RPI Engineers women's ice hockey Rookie of the Year
2016 RPI Engineers women's ice hockey Most Valuable Player

NWHL
NWHL Player of the Week, Awarded November 6, 2017
 2018 NWHL Most Valuable Player
 2018 NWHL Scoring Champion
 Most Valuable Player, 2018 Isobel Cup Finals

References

External links 
 RPI player profile

Living people
American women's ice hockey forwards
New York Riveters players
Metropolitan Riveters players
Isobel Cup champions
1994 births
RPI Engineers women's ice hockey players
Professional Women's Hockey Players Association players
21st-century American women